The 1882–83 season was the tenth season of competitive football in Scotland, United Kingdom. This season saw the introduction of the latest in the series of regional competitions with the inaugural playing of the Fife Cup.

Honours

Cup honours

National

County

Other

Teams in F.A. Cup

Scotland national team

Notes

References

External links
Scottish Football Historical Archive

 
Seasons in Scottish football